Mehrdad Solhi (مهرداد صلحی born May 3, 1991) is an Iranian soccer player who plays for Padideh FC as a forward.

Background
Solhi was born to Fariba and Mohammad Solhi in Tehran, Iran. He has an older brother and a younger sister. His parents both reside in Tehran. His father, a wrestler, entered local competitions before wrestling for the Asian Cup.

References

Iranian footballers
Living people
Association football forwards
Year of birth missing (living people)